1LINK (Guarantee) Limited is a consortium of major banks that own and operate the largest representative interbank network in Pakistan and is incorporated under the Company Law, Section 42 by Security and Exchange Commission of Pakistan (SECP).
1LINK is converted to Private Limited Company under section 49 of Companies Act 2017 on July 5, 2018.

History

Formation
Year 1999: ABN AMRO and Askari Bank connected their ATM network to provide expanded services to their customers.
Year 2002: SBP circular for the mandatory connectivity of either of the two switches (1LINK or MNET).
Year 2003: 1LINK formed with a consortium of eleven founder banks.
Year 2004: SBP instructed 1LINK and MNET to interconnect with each other.
Year 2005: 1LINK partnership with Visa International using cutting edge technology
Year 2006: 1LINK launched Inter Bank Funds Transfer Service (IBFT)
Year 2007: 1LINK launched Utility Bill Payment Service (UBPS) 

1LINK is owned by the consortium of eleven major banks of the country and operates through a chief executive officer. The company Board consists of eleven directors, one from each founder member bank.

The era of President General Pervez Musharraf starting from 1999 saw a revolution in the banking industry. By using ATMs, people had the ease of accessing their own money and they no longer had to go through the hassle of bank queues for withdrawing cash.

1LINK Members
The number of 1LINK member banks has increased rapidly since the inception of the company in 2004. 

1LINK is the largest banking consortium in Pakistan. The State Bank of Pakistan has mandated that all commercial banks in Pakistan, both foreign and domestic, become members of 1LINK. Additionally, the four switches have been interconnected since 2006, which means that a consumer holding an ATM or debit card issued by any bank in Pakistan may use any ATM located throughout the country. 

Member Banks - 37
Affiliates Members - 06
White Label ATMs - 01
Billers - 730
Exchange Companies -04

Statistics
 Strength of 38 banks, including all Islamic banks of the country and microfinance institutions.
 Pakistan’s largest ATM switch with 16,000+ ATMs in 200+ cities nationwide. 
 Debit/credit card base exceeding 7.11 million. 
 Volume of PKR 14.8 billion (monthly average) of ATM withdrawal. 
 Inter bank funds transfer among more than 3000 branches of participating IBFT Banks nationwide. 
 Monthly PKR 388 million (approximate) transfer of funds among IBFT banks.

Products and Services
Shared ATM Network
Inter Bank Funds Transfer (1IBFT)
Bill Payment Service (BPS)
SatNav (GPS) Connectivity
1BILL
1QR
1ID
FRMS
BCCP
Switch Dispute Resolution System

PayPak - Domestic Payment Scheme

In line with State Bank of Pakistan vision 2020 to enhance and promote financial inclusion, 1LINK launched Pakistan’s first domestic payment scheme – PayPak in April, 2016.

PayPak has 10% of market share in terms of volume of cards in the market.

While Visa has 40%, Mastercard and UnionPay have 25% each of market share.

See also
Raast

References

Banking in Pakistan
Payment systems
Banking technology
Interbank networks
Pakistani brands